Maulana Muhammad Qasim is a Pakistani politician who had been a member of the National Assembly of Pakistan from 2008 to 2013.

Political career
He was elected to the National Assembly of Pakistan from Constituency NA-10 (Mardan-II) as a candidate of Muttahida Majlis-e-Amal (MMA) in 2002 Pakistani general election. He received 69,726 votes and defeated Rahim Dad Khan, a candidate of Pakistan Peoples Party (PPP).

He was re-elected to the National Assembly from Constituency NA-10 (Mardan-II) as a candidate of MMA in 2008 Pakistani general election. He received 29,279 votes and defeated Nawabzada Abdul Qadir Khan, a candidate of PPP.
 
He ran for the seat of the National Assembly from Constituency NA-10 (Mardan-II) as a candidate of Jamiat Ulema-e Islam (F) (JUI-F) in 2013 Pakistani general election but was unsuccessful. He received 39,269 votes and lost the seat to Ali Muhammad Khan, a candidate of Pakistan Tehreek-e-Insaf (PTI).

He ran for the seat of the National Assembly from Constituency NA-22 (Mardan-III) as a candidate of MMA in 2018 Pakistani general election but was unsuccessful. He received 56,318 votes and lost the seat to Ali Muhammad Khan, a candidate of PTI.

He ran for the seat of the National Assembly from Constituency NA-22 (Mardan-III) as a candidate of JUI-F in 2022 Pakistan by-elections but was unsuccessful. He received 68,181 votes and lost the seat to Imran Khan, the chairman of PTI.

References

People from Mardan District
Pakistani MNAs 2008–2013
Pakistani MNAs 2002–2007
Living people
Year of birth missing (living people)